Melville was a federal electoral district in Saskatchewan, Canada, that was represented in the House of Commons of Canada from 1925 to 1968. This riding was created in 1924 from parts of Saltcoats riding.

It was abolished in 1966 when it was redistributed into Regina East and Yorkton—Melville ridings.

Election results

|-

|Farmer
|John Morris Thomas
|align=right|3,221

|-

|Unity
|Gilbert Henry Bartlett
|align=right|1,837

See also 

 List of Canadian federal electoral districts
 Past Canadian electoral districts

External links 
 

Melville, Saskatchewan
Former federal electoral districts of Saskatchewan